Khalkhal or Khalkhāl or Khal Khal may refer to:

Xalxal, Nakhchivan, a village in Azerbaijan
Xalxal, Oghuz, a village and municipality in Azerbaijan
Khalkhal County, a subdivision of Ardabil Province, Iran
Herowabad, a city in Ardabil province, Iran
Khalkhal, Ardabil, a town in Ardabil province, Iran
Khal Khal, Kermanshah, a village in Kermanshah province, Iran